This article is intended to give an overview of several arguments for and against drug prohibition.

Efficiency

Drug laws are effective
Supporters of prohibition claim that drug laws have a successful track record suppressing illicit drug use since they were introduced in the 1910s. The licit drug alcohol has current (last 12 months) user rates as high as 80–90% in populations over 14 years of age,  and tobacco has historically had current use rates up to 60% of adult populations, yet the percentages currently using illicit drugs in OECD countries are generally below 1% of the population excepting cannabis where most are between 3% and 10%, with six countries between 11% and 17%.

In the 50-year period following the first 1912 international convention restricting use of opium, heroin and cocaine, the United States' use of illicit drugs other than cannabis was consistently below 0.5% of the population, with cannabis rising to 1–2% of the population between 1955 and 1965. With the advent of the counter-culture movement from the late 1950s, where illicit drug use was promoted as mind-expanding and relatively harmless, illicit drug use rose sharply.  With illicit drug use peaking in the 1970s in the United States, the "Just Say No" campaign, initiated under the patronage of Nancy Reagan, coincided with recent (past month) illicit drug use decreases from 14.1% in 1979 to 5.8% in 1992, a drop of 60%.

In March, 2007, Antonio Maria Costa, former executive director of the United Nations Office on Drugs and Crime, drew attention to the drug policy of Sweden, arguing:

In Europe as of 2007, Sweden spends the second highest percentage of GDP, after the Netherlands, on drug control. The UNODC argues that when Sweden reduced spending on education and rehabilitation in the 1990s in a context of higher youth unemployment and declining GDP growth, illicit drug use rose but restoring expenditure from 2002 again sharply decreased drug use as student surveys indicate. In 1998, a poll run by SIFO of 1,000 Swedes found that 96% wanted stronger action by government to stop drug abuse, and 95% wanted drug use to remain illegal.

Criticizing governments that have relaxed their drug laws, Antonio Maria Costa, speaking in Washington before the launch of the World Drug Report in June 2006, said:

Inefficiency

Drug laws are ineffective

One of the prominent early critics of prohibition in the United States was August Vollmer, founder of the School of Criminology at University of California, Irvine and former president of the International Association of Chiefs of Police. In his 1936 book The Police and Modern Society, he stated his opinion that:

Stephen Rolles, writing in the British Medical Journal in 2010, argues:

These conclusions have been reached by a succession of committees and reports including, in the United Kingdom alone, the Police Foundation, the Home Affairs Select Committee, the Prime Minister's Strategy Unit, the Royal Society of Arts, and the UK Drug Policy Consortium. The United Nations Office of Drugs and Crime has also acknowledged the many "unintended negative consequences" of drug enforcement.

The editor of the British Medical Journal, Dr. Fiona Godlee, gave her personal support to Rolles' call for decriminalisation, and the arguments drew particular support from Sir Ian Gilmore, former president of the Royal College of Physicians, who said we should be treating drugs "as a health issue rather than criminalising people" and "this could drastically reduce crime and improve health".

Danny Kushlik, head of external affairs at Transform, said the intervention of senior medical professionals was significant. He said: "Sir Ian's statement is yet another nail in prohibition's coffin. The Hippocratic oath says: 'First, do no harm'. Physicians are duty bound to speak out if the outcomes show that prohibition causes more harm than it reduces."

Nicholas Green, chairman of the Bar Council, made comments in a report in the profession's magazine, in which he said that drug-related crime costs the UK economy about £13bn a year and that there was growing evidence that decriminalisation could free up police resources, reduce crime and recidivism and improve public health.

A 2006 report sponsored by the New York County Lawyers' Association, one of the largest local bar associations in the United States, argues on the subject of US drug policy:

In response to claims that prohibition can work, as argued by Antonio Maria Costa, executive director of the United Nations Office on Drugs and Crime, who drew attention to the drug policy of Sweden, Henrik Tham has written in 1998 that sometimes it's domestically important to stress drug policy as successful; in the case of Sweden, where this notion is important, such claims serve "the function of strengthening a threatened national identity in a situation where the traditional 'Swedish model' has come under increasingly hard attack from both inside and outside the country." Tham questions the success of the Swedish model – "The shift in Swedish drug policy since around 1980" ...(more difficult to receive nolle prosequi for minor drug crimes) ..."towards a more strict model has according to the official point of view been successful by comparison with the earlier, more lenient drug policy. However, available systematic indicators show that the prevalence of drug use has increased since around 1980, that the decrease in drug incidence was particularly marked during the 1970s and that some indicators point towards an increase during the 1990s."

Leif Lenke and Börje Olsson from Stockholm University have conducted research that showed how drug use have followed the youth unemployment in close correlation. They noted that unlike most of Europe, Sweden did not have widespread and lingering youth unemployment until the early 1990s financial crisis, suggesting that unattractive future prospects may contribute to the increase in drug use among the young. CAN, the Swedish Council for Information on Alcohol and Other Drugs, 2009 report stated that the increase in drug use have continued since the 1990s with a slight dip in the mid-2000.

The professor emeritus in criminology at the University of Oslo, Nils Christie, pointed out Sweden as the hawk of international drug policy in a 2004 book. He said that Sweden is serving the role of being welfare alibi for, and lending legitimacy to, the US drug war. Adding that USA and Sweden have had an extraordinary influence on UNODC as the biggest donor countries. Sweden was the second biggest donor financing 8% of the UNODC budget behind the European Commission in 2006, followed by the US. In 2007 and 2008 Sweden was the fourth biggest donor, behind the European Commission, USA and Canada. In 2009 it was the third, as USA withdrew some of its funding.

A 2009 editorial in The Economist argued: 

Antonio Maria Costa's conviction that "countries have the drug problem they deserve" if they fail to follow the "Swedish Model" in drug control has also been criticised in Peter Cohen's work – Looking at the UN, smelling a rat.

In its 2011 report, the Global Commission on Drug Policy stated that "The global war on drugs has failed, with devastating consequences for individuals and societies around the world".

Deterrence

Arguments that prohibition discourages drug use
A 2001 Australian study, of 18- to 29-year-olds by the NSW Bureau of Crime Statistics and Research suggests that prohibition deters illicit drug use. 29% of those who had never used cannabis cited the illegality of the substance as their reason for never using the drug, while 19% of those who had ceased use of cannabis cited its illegality as their reason.

Gil Kerlikowske, director of the US ONDCP argued,

The DEA argues "Legalization has been tried before—and failed miserably. Alaska's experiment with legalization in the 1970s led to the state's teens using marijuana at more than twice the rate of other youths nationally. This led Alaska's residents to vote to re-criminalize marijuana in 1990."

Drug Free Australia has cited the Netherlands as an example of drug policy failure because it is soft in approach. They argue that the Dutch idea of going soft on cannabis dealers, thereby creating a "separation of markets" from hard drug dealers has failed to stem the initiation to drugs such as heroin, cocaine, and amphetamines, saying that, in 1998, the Netherlands had the third highest cannabis and cocaine use in Europe. According to Barry McCaffrey of the US Office of National Drug Control Policy, Dutch tolerance has allowed the Netherlands to become a criminal epicentre for illicit synthetic drug manufacture, particularly ecstasy, as well as the home for production and worldwide export of strains of cannabis with THC reportedly 10 times higher than normal. Gil Kerlikowske has attested that, where there were once thousands of cannabis cafés there are now only several hundred. Levels of cannabis use, in 2005 only marginally higher than in 1998, while other European countries have accelerated past them, are more likely, Drug Free Australia argues, the result of a growing intolerance of cannabis in the Netherlands rather than a growing tolerance. Drug Free Australia has also argued that British reductions in cannabis use after softer legislation may be more so the result of heavy UK media exposure of the stronger evidence of links between cannabis and psychosis.

Arguments that prohibition does not discourage drug use
It has been suggested that drug law reform could reduce the use of hard drugs as it has in countries such as the Netherlands. According to a 2009 annual report by the European Monitoring Centre for Drugs and Drug Addiction, the Dutch are among the lowest users of marijuana or cannabis in Europe, despite the Netherlands' policy on soft drugs being one of the most liberal in Europe, allowing for the sale of marijuana at "coffee shops", which the Dutch have allowed to operate for decades, and possession of less than 5 grams (0.18 oz).

British Crime Survey statistics indicated that the proportion of 16- to 24-year-olds using cannabis decreased from 28% a decade ago to 21%, with its declining popularity accelerating after the decision to downgrade the drug to class C was announced in January 2004. The BCS figures, published in October 2007, showed that the proportion of frequent users in the 16–24 age group (i.e. who were using cannabis more than once a month), fell from 12% to 8% in the past four years.

American teenagers are drinking and smoking less and doing fewer drugs than their predecessors in more than 40 years of tracking. Use of marijuana is down among 8th- and 10th-graders, though it is flat among high school seniors, according to the annual Monitoring the Future survey of American teens.

A 2008 scholarly study found that intensified enforcement of marijuana laws does not achieve the stated goals of
marijuana prohibition and that "decriminalizing marijuana possession or deprioritizing marijuana law enforcement does not appear to increase marijuana use".

Gateway drug theory

Arguments that cannabis is a gateway drug
The US Drug Enforcement Agency's "2008 Marijuana Sourcebook" argues that recent research supports the gateway hypothesis that certain drugs (such as cannabis) act as gateways to use of 'harder' drugs such as heroin, either because of social contact or because of an increasing search for a better high. Proponents cite studies such as that of 311 same sex twins, where only one twin smoked cannabis before age 17, and where such early cannabis smokers were five times more likely than their twin to move on to harder drugs.

Arguments that cannabis is not a gateway drug
In the American Journal of Public Health, Andrew Golub and Bruce Johnson of the National Development and Research Institute in New York wrote that young people who smoked marijuana in the generations before and after the baby boomers did not appear to be likely to move on to harder drugs.

Researchers from the independent Rand Drug Policy Research Center in Santa Monica, California, looking at data from the National Household Survey on Drug Abuse between 1982 and 1994, concluded that teenagers who took hard drugs did so whether they had first tried cannabis or not.

A twin study (of 510 same sex twin pairs) which adjusted for additional confounders such as peer drug use, found that cannabis use and associations with later hard drug use existed only for non-identical twins. The study suggested that a causal role of cannabis use in later hard drug usage is minimal, if it exists at all, and that cannabis use and hard drug use share the same influencing factors such as genetics and environment.

Health

Health arguments for drug laws
Advocates of prohibition argue that particular drugs should be illegal because they are harmful. Drug Free Australia for example argues "That illicit drugs are inherently harmful substances is attested by the very nomenclature of the 'harm reduction' movement." The U.S. government has argued that illegal drugs are "far more deadly than alcohol" saying "although alcohol is used by seven times as many people as drugs, the number of deaths induced by those substances is not far apart. According to the Centers for Disease Control and Prevention (CDC), during 2000, there were 15,852 drug-induced deaths; only slightly less than the 18,539 alcohol-induced deaths." Ratios of the harms of illicit opiates to licit alcohol and tobacco in Australia are similar, with 2 deaths per hundred opiate users per annum versus 0.22 deaths per hundred for alcohol (9 times less) per year and 0.3 for tobacco (7 times less).

The DEA has said:

Many of the deaths from using cannabis, other than from car accidents while intoxicated or violence and aggression, are more likely to figure in the longer term, just as with tobacco, where both nicotine overdose and cannabis overdose are extremely rare or nonexistent.  While ecstasy may have lower rates of immediate mortality than some other illicits, there is a growing science on the already recognized considerable health harms of ecstasy. Drug Free Australia argues that distinctions between "soft" and "hard" drugs are entirely artificial, and titling cannabis "soft" or ecstasy "recreational" does not lessen the extensive harms of these substances.

Gil Kerlikowske, former director of the US Office of National Drug Control Policy (ONDCP) argues that in the United States, illegal drugs already cost $180 billion a year in health care, lost productivity, crime, and other expenditures, and that number would only increase under legalization because of increased use.

Drug Free Australia claims arguments that increased health harms of illicit drugs are the result of lack of government regulation of their purity and strength are not well supported by evidence. In Australia, which has had the highest opioid mortality per capita in the OECD, studies found that "overdose fatality is not a simple function of heroin dose or purity. There is no evidence of toxicity from contaminants of street heroin in Australia." Drug Free Australia claims that other causes of death such as suicide, murder and accidents are an effect of the drug themselves, not of their purity or otherwise.

Addiction
Drug Free Australia argues "Regarding the freedom of choice of those addicted to a drug, it is important to recognize that addiction is defined as compulsive by its very nature and that addictions curb individual freedom." ... "As is the case with alcohol addiction, illicit drug addictions likewise serve to keep many such users functionally in poverty and often as a continued burden on friends, family and society. Where it is argued that all disabilities are a burden on society it must be recognized that most disabilities are not the result of a choice, whereas the decision to recreationally use illicit drugs is most commonly free, and with the knowledge that they may lead to an abundance of addictions."

Health arguments for drug law reform
There is evidence that many illicit drugs pose comparatively fewer health dangers than certain legal drugs. The health risks of MDMA (Ecstasy) have been exaggerated for instance, the risks from cannabis use also overstated, and health problems from the use of legal substances, particularly alcohol and tobacco, are greater, even than from cocaine use for example (occasional cocaine use does not typically lead to severe or even minor physical or social problems).

Health benefits
Many trials have shown beneficial effects associated with psychoactive drug use:

 There is evidence that MDMA (ecstasy) can treat or cure post-traumatic stress disorder and anxiety in cases of terminal illness.
 LSD has been widely researched as a therapeutic agent, and has shown effectiveness against alcoholism, frigidity and various other disorders. See Psychedelic therapy.
 Researchers at Harvard-affiliated McLean Hospital found members of a religious group regularly using peyote scored significantly better on several measures of overall mental health than did subjects who did not use the hallucinogen.
 A 2007 study, by Santos et al. found that users of ayahuasca scored better on tests measuring anxiety and hopelessness than people who did not use the drug.

Quality control
According to a World Health Organisation report: "As cannabis is an illegal drug its cultivation, harvesting and distribution are not subject to quality control mechanisms to ensure the reliability and safety of the product used by consumers. It is well recognised in developing countries, such as Kenya, that illicit alcohol production can result in the contamination with toxic by-products or adulterants that can kill or seriously affect the health of users. The same may be true of illicit drugs such as opiates, cocaine and amphetamine in developed societies."

The government cannot enforce quality control on products sold and manufactured illegally. Examples include: the easier to make derivative MDA being sold as MDMA, heroin users unintentionally injecting brick dust, quinine, or fentanyl with which their heroin had been cut; and heroin/cocaine overdoses occurring as a result of users not knowing exactly how much they are taking. If the supply of drugs such as ecstasy came from legitimate pharmaceutical companies, their product would be far less likely to contain toxic additives or varying dosages. This is a view supported by a number of parents whose children have died of overdoses.

The illegality of injectable drugs leads to a scarcity of needles which causes an increase in HIV infections. An easy cure to this problem, while upholding the illegality of drugs, is the Dutch policy of distributing free needles. The money spent on both increased health costs due to HIV infections and drug prohibition itself causes a drain upon society.

Studies on the effects of prescribing heroin to addicts as practiced in many European countries have shown better rates of success than any other available treatment in terms of assisting long-term users establish stable, crime-free lives. Many patients were able to find employment, some even started a family after years of homelessness and delinquency.

Block to research
The illegality of many recreational drugs may be dissuading research into new, more effective and perhaps safer recreational drugs, despite evidence that their use may be beneficial in certain contexts. Research on Schedule I drugs in many countries, including the United States and United Kingdom, and under international law, is tightly regulated and requires expensive and hard-to-obtain permits. Such restrictions have largely prevented investigation of their properties and therapeutic uses, and most research since the passage of the drug laws focuses on negative impacts of these drugs. For example, all known agonists of the 5HT2A receptor are psychedelics, which prevents research into this receptor.

In particular, research suggests that recreational drugs may have psychiatric applications, which many demonstrating potential for treatment-resistant mental health conditions, such as depression and anxiety. Those who support the legalisation of recreational drugs for research purposes highlight that it is unethical not to conduct research into therapeutic interventions that may have the potential to treat these conditions.

Misleading health statistics
The United States Drug Enforcement Administration (DEA) has suggested that illegal drugs are "far more deadly than alcohol", arguing that "although alcohol is used by seven times as many people as drugs, the number of deaths induced by those substances is not far apart", quoting figures from the Centers for Disease Control and Prevention (CDC), claiming "during 2000, there were 15,852 drug-induced deaths; only slightly less than the 18,539 alcohol-induced deaths."

The DEA's use of such figures is questionable however. An article in the Journal of the American Medical Association gave the number deaths caused by alcohol in year 2000 as 85,000 – over four and a half times greater than the DEA's preferred figure. The DEA's argument also overlooks tobacco, causing 435,000 US deaths in year 2000. And, the CDC definition of "drug-induced death" includes suicides using drugs, accidental overdose, and deaths from medically prescribed (not illegal) drugs. An analysis of drug-induced deaths for the 20-year period 1979–1998 found the vast majority attributable to accidental overdose, and suicide by drug taking, which together account for about 76 percent of all such deaths. Taking into account deaths from non-illegal drugs leaves only 21 percent of CDC "drug-induced death" figures actually due to the use of "illegal" drugs.

Claims that cannabis is far more powerful than it used to be are also dubious, with "scare figures" skewed by comparing the weakest cannabis from the past with the strongest of today. Figures regarding emergency room mentions of marijuana use can be misleading too, as "mention" of a drug in an emergency department visit does not mean that the drug was the cause of the visit.

Medical uses
A document published for the non-profit advocacy organization Europe Against Drugs (EURAD) argues that "one cannot vote for a medicine" and that a scientific approval basis is essential. It says that EU rules set out strict criteria for the acceptance of a drug for medical use:

Arguments against medical uses of prohibited drugs
According to Janet D. Lapey, M.D., of Concerned Citizens For Drug Prevention, " Due to a placebo effect, a patient may erroneously believe a drug is helpful when it is not.  This is especially true of addictive, mind-altering drugs like marijuana. A marijuana withdrawal syndrome occurs, consisting of anxiety, depression, sleep and appetite disturbances, irritability, tremors, diaphoresis, nausea, muscle convulsions, and restlessness. Often, persons using marijuana erroneously believe that the drug is helping them combat these symptoms without realizing that actually marijuana is the cause of these effects. Therefore, when a patient anecdotally reports a drug to have medicinal value, this must be followed by objective scientific studies."

The US Drug Enforcement Administration also says:

Arguments for medical uses of prohibited drugs
Most of the psychoactive drugs now prohibited in modern societies have had medical uses in history. In natural plant drugs like opium, coca, cannabis, mescaline, and psilocybin, the medical history usually dates back thousands of years and through a variety of cultures.

Psychedelics such as LSD and psilocybin (the main ingredient in most hallucinogenic mushrooms) are the subject of renewed research interest because of their therapeutic potential. They could ease a variety of difficult-to-treat mental illnesses, such as chronic depression, post-traumatic stress disorder, and alcohol dependency. In 2018, the United States Food and Drug Administration (FDA) granted breakthrough therapy designation for psilocybin-assisted therapy for treatment-resistant major depressive disorder. In 2019, the FDA also granted breakthrough therapy designation for psilocybin therapy treating major depressive disorder more generally. MDMA (Ecstasy) has been used for cognitive enhancement in people with Parkinson's disease, and has shown potential in treating posttraumatic stress disorder, social anxiety, and alcohol addiction.

Lack of access to controlled medications
Under prohibition, millions of people find it very difficult to obtain controlled medications, particularly opiate pain-relievers. The United Nations 1961 Single Convention on Narcotic Drugs requires that opiates be distributed only by medical prescription, but this is impractical in many areas.

According to the Transnational Institute, June 2008:
According to the International Narcotics Control Board (INCB) and the World Health Organisation (WHO) there is now an unmet demand in opiates. Ironically, the current drug control regulations hamper access to controlled opiate medications for therapeutic use. Many patients are unable to access morphine, methadone or an equivalent opioid. Global medical morphine consumption would rise five times if countries would make morphine available at the level of the calculated need, according to a recent WHO estimate.

According to the New York Times, September 2007:
Under Sierra Leone law, morphine may be handled only by a pharmacist or doctor, explained Gabriel Madiye, the hospice's founder. But in all Sierra Leone there are only about 100 doctors — one for every 54,000 people, compared with one for every 350 in the United States.... "How can they say there is no demand when they don't allow it?" he [Madiye] asked. "How can they be so sure that it will get out of control when they haven't even tried it?"

Economic

Economic arguments for prohibitive drug laws
The DEA argues that "compared to the social costs of drug abuse and addiction—whether in taxpayer dollars or in pain and suffering—government spending on drug control is minimal."

Antonio Maria Costa, executive director of the United Nations Office on Drugs and Crime, has said: 

Gil Kerlikowske, former director of the US ONDCP, argues that legalizing drugs, then regulating and taxing their sale, would not be effective fiscally. 

Former directors of the ONDCP, John P. Walters and Barry McCaffrey have accused billionaires George Soros, Peter Lewis and John Sperling of bankrolling the pro-pot or drug legalisation movement. "These people use ignorance and their overwhelming amount of money to influence the electorate", Walters said. Billionaire US financier, George Soros said in his autobiography, "I would establish a strictly controlled distribution network through which I would make most drugs, excluding the most dangerous ones like crack, legally available." The drug legalization lobby's vigorous and well funded promotion in media and schools of a "safe use of illegal drugs" message
indicates that drug prohibition is in the midst of a pitched battle waged by those who are accepting not only of the drug user but who also strongly promote an acceptance of drug use itself.

Prohibition of hemp industry
Opposition to the legalization of hemp, which uses plants of the cannabis genus for commercial purposes, centres on the fact that those wanting to legalize the use of cannabis for recreational and medical purposes themselves present it as their Trojan horse for that very purpose:

In a Huffington Post interview, Mark Kleiman, the "Pot Czar" of Washington state, said he was concerned that the National Cannabis Industry Association would favor profits over public health. He also said that it could become a predatory body like the lobbying arms of the tobacco and alcohol industries. Kleiman said: "The fact that the National Cannabis Industry Association has hired itself a K Street suit [lobbyist] is not a good sign."

Economic arguments for drug law reform
The United States efforts at drug prohibition started out with a $350 million budget in 1971, and was in 2006 a $30 billion campaign. These numbers only include direct prohibition enforcement expenditures, and as such only represent part of the total cost of prohibition. This $30 billion figure rises dramatically once other issues, such as the economic impact of holding 400,000 prisoners on prohibition violations, are factored in.

The war on drugs is extremely costly to such societies that outlaw drugs in terms of taxpayer money, lives, productivity, the inability of law enforcement to pursue mala in se crimes, and social inequality. Some proponents of decriminalization say that the financial and social costs of drug law enforcement far exceed the damages that the drugs themselves cause. For instance, in 1999, close to 60,000 prisoners (3.3% of the total incarcerated population) convicted of violating marijuana laws were behind bars at a cost to taxpayers of some $1.2 billion per year. In 1980, the total jail and prison population was 540,000, about one-quarter the size it is today. Drug offenders accounted for 6% of all prisoners. According to the Federal Bureau of Prisons, drug offenders now account for nearly 51%.

It has been argued that if the US government legalised marijuana it would save $7.7 billion per year in expenditure on enforcement of prohibition. Also, that marijuana legalization would yield tax revenue of $2.4 billion annually if it were taxed like all other goods and $6.2 billion annually if it were taxed at rates comparable to those on alcohol and tobacco.

According to a 2018 report, legalising cannabis in the United Kingdom could raise between 1 and 3.5 billion pounds in tax and lead to savings for the police and the criminal justice system. It has been argued that the raised tax revenue could then be invested in public services, such as the budget of the National Health Service (NHS).

The creation of drug cartels
Mass arrests of local growers of marijuana, for example, not only increase the price of local drugs, but lessens competition. Only major retailers that can handle massive shipments, have their own small fleet of aircraft, troops to defend the caravans and other sophisticated methods of eluding the police (such as lawyers), can survive by this regulation of the free market by the government

Effect on producer countries
The United States' "War on Drugs" has added considerably to the political instability in South America. The huge profits to be made from cocaine and other South American-grown drugs are largely because they are illegal in the wealthy neighbouring nation. This drives people in the relatively poor countries of Colombia, Peru, Bolivia and Brazil to break their own laws in organising the cultivation, preparation and trafficking of cocaine to the States. This has allowed criminal, paramilitary and guerrilla groups to reap huge profits, exacerbating already serious law-and-order and political problems. Within Bolivia, the political rise of former president Evo Morales was directly related to his grassroots movement against US-sponsored coca-eradication and criminalization policies. However, coca has been cultivated for centuries in the Andes. Among their various legitimate uses, coca leaves are chewed for their mild stimulant & appetite suppression effects, and steeped as a tea which is known to reduce the effects of human altitude sickness. Rural farmers in the poor regions in which coca has historically been cultivated often find themselves at the difficult and potentially violent intersection of government-sponsored eradication efforts, illegal cocaine producers & traffickers seeking coca supplies, anti-government paramilitary forces trafficking in cocaine as a source of revolutionary funding, and the historical hardships of rural subsistence farming (or its typical alternative – abandoning their land and fleeing to an urban slum). In some regions, farmers' coca and other crops are frequently destroyed by U.S.-sponsored eradication treatments (usually sprayed from the air with varying degrees of discrimination), whether or not the farmers directly supply the cocaine trade, thereby destroying their livelihoods. Agricultural producers in these countries are pushed further to grow coca for the cocaine trade by the dumping of subsidised farming products (fruit, vegetables, grain etc.) produced by Western countries (predominantly US and EU agricultural surpluses) (see BBC reference, below), which reduces the prices they could otherwise receive for alternate crops such as maize. The net effect can be a depression of prices for all crops, which can both make the farmer's livelihood more precarious, and make the cocaine producers' coca supplies cheaper.

After providing a significant portion of the world's poppy for use in heroin production, Afghanistan went from producing practically no illegal drugs in 2000 (following banning by the Taliban), to cultivating what is now as much as 90% of the world's opium. The Taliban is currently believed to be heavily supported by the opium trade there.

Furthermore, the sale of the illegal drugs produces an influx of dollars that is outside the formal economy, and puts pressure on the currency exchange keeping the dollar low and making the export of legal products more difficult.

Prohibition of hemp industry

The war on drugs has resulted in the outlawing of the entire hemp industry in the United States. Hemp, which is a special cultivar of Cannabis sativa, does not have significant amounts of psychoactive (THC) substances in it, less than 1%. Without even realizing the plant had been outlawed several months prior, Popular Mechanics magazine published an article in 1938 entitled "The New Billion-Dollar Crop" anticipating the explosion of the hemp industry with the invention of machines to help process it. Recently, governmental refusal to take advantage of taxing hemp has been a point of criticism. Hemp has a large list of potential industrial uses including textiles, paper, rope, fuel, construction materials, and biocomposites (for use in cars for example). Hemp has some drawbacks, however, one being that the long fibers in hemp are only a part of the outer bast, and this has contributed to hemp having only modest commercial success in countries (for example in Canada) where it is legal to harvest hemp.

The seed of the hemp plant is highly nutritious. Rare for a plant, it contains all essential amino acids. Rare for any food, it is a good source of alpha-linolenic acid, an omega 3 fatty acid which is deficient in most diets.

Legalization as a job creator
Drug legalization has the potential to create a vast array of jobs, in sectors such as: sales, distribution, transportation, growing, cultivation, production, quality assurance, regulatory bodies, advertising, scientific research and lab analysis. If certain drugs were to be sold solely at single-purpose licensed premises then construction of these stores would also help the construction industry.

A 2019 jobs count found that legalized cannabis had directly created 211,000 full-time workers in the U.S., part of a total of 296,000 in all related areas combined (as a total of states where cannabis is legal). Nick Colas at DataTrek Research said in 2019 that cannabis is the “fastest-growing labor market in the U.S.” If cannabis were to be legalized nationally across the U.S., it is estimated that it would create over one million jobs.

Before the legalization of cannabis in Canada, it was estimated that the legalization of cannabis in the country would create thousands of new jobs. However, comprehensive statistics regarding the total amount jobs created by legalized cannabis in Canada have yet to be published post legalization. Cannabis was legalized in Canada on 17 October 2018.

Crime, terrorism and social order

Arguments for prohibitive drug laws
While concerns are sometimes expressed that the "war on drugs" can never be won, there is a failure to recognize that other justifiably costly policing wars such as "blitzes" on speeding can likewise never be won. Such blitzes reduce and contain speeding, as with policing of illicit drug use.  Failure to police speeding drivers simply allows inordinate harm to be inflicted on other individuals. Speeding is not legalized simply because it can never be eradicated.

There is an argument that much crime and terrorism is drug related or drug funded and that prohibition should reduce this.

Former US president George W. Bush, in signing the Drug-Free Communities Act Reauthorization Bill in December 2001, said, "If you quit drugs, you join the fight against terror in America."

The US Office of National Drug Control Policy (ONDCP) says that drug-related offences may include violent behavior resulting from drug effects.

The US Drug Enforcement Administration claims:

The U.S. government began the Drug Use Forecasting (DUF) program in 1987 to collect information on drug use among urban arrestees. In 1997, the National Institute of Justice expanded and reengineered the DUF study and renamed it the Arrestee Drug Abuse Monitoring (ADAM) program. ADAM is a network of 34 research sites in select U.S. cities.

DUF research indicates that:

  Frequent use of hard drugs is one of the strongest indicators of a criminal career.
  Offenders who use drugs are among the most serious and active criminals, engaging in both property and violent crime.
  Early and persistent use of cocaine or heroin in the juvenile years is an indicator of serious, persistent criminal behavior in adulthood.
  Those arrested who are drug users are more likely than those not using drugs to be rearrested on pretrial release or fail to appear at trial.

Criminal behavior can importantly be the direct result of drug use which can cause emotional/brain damage, mental illness and anti-social behavior. Psychoactive drugs can have a powerful impact on behavior which may influence some people to commit crimes that have nothing to do with supporting the cost of their drug use. The use of drugs changes behavior and causes criminal activity because people will do things they wouldn't do if they were rational and free of the drug's influence.  Cocaine-related paranoia is an example. If drug use increases with legalization, so will such forms of related violent crime as assaults, drugged driving, child abuse, and domestic violence.

That higher prices make the trade lucrative for criminals is recognized but countered by the argument that capitulating to illicit drug use on these grounds makes no more sense than capitulating to those who continue to traffic in human lives, a more expensive business because of its illegality and therefore more lucrative for the criminal, but necessary for the rights of vulnerable citizens.

The Office of National Drug Control Policy says that the idea that our nation's prisons are overflowing with otherwise law-abiding people convicted for nothing more than simple possession of marijuana is a myth, "an illusion conjured and aggressively perpetuated by drug advocacy groups seeking to relax or abolish America's marijuana laws." ONDCP state that the vast majority of inmates in state and federal prison for marijuana have been found guilty of much more than simple possession. Some were convicted for drug trafficking, some for marijuana possession along with one or more other offenses. And many of those serving time for marijuana pleaded down to possession in order to avoid prosecution on much more serious charges. In the US, just 1.6 percent of the state inmate population were held for offences involving only marijuana, and less than one percent of all state prisoners (0.7 percent) were incarcerated with marijuana possession as the only charge. An even smaller fraction of state prisoners were first time offenders (0.3 percent). The numbers on the US federal prisons are similar. In 2001, the overwhelming majority of offenders sentenced for marijuana crimes were convicted for trafficking and only 63 served time for simple possession.

Detective superintendent Eva Brännmark from the Swedish National Police Board, in a speech given to Drug Free Australia's first international conference on illicit drug use, said:

The argument that drug addicts of certain drugs are forced into crime by prohibition should first and foremost highlight the fact that this argument presupposes and underlines the addictive nature of some illicit drugs (which legalization proponents often downplay), addictive enough to create a viable criminal supply industry.  Secondly, the harms of increased addictive drug use, which as previously outlined would be a consequence of legalization and its cheaper prices, far outweigh the current crime harms of prohibition. It is worth pointing out, this argument is not useful for substances such as LSD and mescaline, with no addictive properties.

Although criminal punishments vary with rooting out drug usage, it is not the foremost eradication technique to resolve substance use disorder issues. In order to combat these issues, the application of treatment and support group resources coupled with community support and understanding, has far higher long-term potential to cure the ever-growing epidemic plaguing the nation, especially in rural areas.

Arguments for drug law reform
In 2021, Professor Peter Singer described the War on Drugs as an expensive, ineffective and extremely harmful policy.

Violence and profits of drugs traffickers
Prohibition protects the drug cartel insofar as it keeps the distribution in the black market and creates the risk that makes smuggling profitable. As former federal narcotics officer Michael Levine states in relation to his undercover work with Colombian cocaine cartels, from Lamar
"I learned that not only did they not fear our war on drugs, they counted on it to increase the market price and to weed out the smaller, inefficient drug dealers. They found U.S. interdiction efforts laughable. The only U.S. action they feared was an effective demand reduction program. On one undercover tape-recorded conversation, a top cartel chief, Jorge Roman, expressed his gratitude for the drug war, calling it "a sham put on for the American taxpayer" that was actually "good for business".

Critics of drug prohibition often cite the fact that the end of alcohol prohibition in 1933 led to immediate decreases in murders and robberies to support the argument that legalization of drugs could have similar effects. Once those involved in the narcotics trade have a legal method of settling business disputes, the number of murders and violent crime could drop. Robert W. Sweet, a federal judge, strongly agrees: "The present policy of trying to prohibit the use of drugs through the use of criminal law is a mistake". When alcohol use was outlawed during prohibition, it gave rise to gang warfare and spurred the formation of some of the most well known criminals of the era, among them the infamous Al Capone. Similarly, drug dealers today resolve their disputes through violence and intimidation, something which legal drug vendors do not do. Prohibition critics also point to the fact that police are more likely to be corrupted in a system where bribe money is so available. Police corruption due to drugs is widespread enough that one pro-legalization newsletter has made it a weekly feature.

Drug money has been called a major source of income for terrorist organizations. Critics assert that legalization would remove this central source of support for terrorism. While politicians blame drug users for being a major source of financing terrorists, no clear evidence of this link has been provided. US government agencies and government officials have been caught trafficking drugs to finance US-supported terrorist actions in events such as the Iran-Contra Affair, and Manuel Noriega but the isolated nature of these events precludes them from being major sources of financing.

Corruption
Human rights organizations and legal scholars have claimed that drug prohibition inevitably leads to police corruption.

On 2 July 2010, former Interpol President Jackie Selebi was found guilty of corruption by the South African High Court in Johannesburg for accepting bribes worth US$156,000 from a drug trafficker. After being charged in January 2008, Selebi resigned as president of Interpol and was put on extended leave as National Police Commissioner of South Africa.

Stigma of conviction
Despite the fact that most drug offenders are non-violent, the stigma attached to a conviction can prevent employment and education.

Since the human brain continues to mature past age eighteen and into a person's early twenties, it has been argued that many adult drug users will have made decisions to take drugs when their brains were not fully developed and thus they may not have adequately appreciated the risks (as many drug users are under the age of thirty). Since having a drug conviction will create societal disadvantages for the rest of a person's life, it has been argued that drug laws do not adequately take into account the full extent of human maturity when punishing people for taking drugs.

Children being lured into the illegal drug trade
Janet Crist of the White House Office of National Drug Control Policy mentioned that the anti-drug efforts have had "no direct effect on either the price or the availability of cocaine on our streets". Additionally, drug dealers show off expensive jewellery and clothing to young children. Some of these children are interested in making fast money instead of working legitimate jobs. Drug decriminalization would remove the "glamorous Al Capone-type traffickers who are role-models for the young".

The lack of government regulation and control over the lucrative illegal drug market has created a large population of unregulated drug dealers who lure many children into the illegal drug trade. The U.S. government's most recent 2009 National Survey on Drug Use and Health (NSDUH) reported that nationwide over 800,000 adolescents ages 12–17 sold illegal drugs during the previous 12 months preceding the survey. The 2005 Youth Risk Behavior Survey by the U.S. Centers for Disease Control and Prevention (CDC) reported that nationwide 25.4% of students had been offered, sold, or given an illegal drug by someone on school property. The prevalence of having been offered, sold, or given an illegal drug on school property ranged from 15.5% to 38.7% across state CDC surveys (median: 26.1%) and from 20.3% to 40.0% across local surveys (median: 29.4%).

Despite more than $7 billion spent annually towards arresting and prosecuting nearly 800,000 people across the country for marijuana offenses in 2005, the federally funded Monitoring the Future Survey reports about 85% of high school seniors find marijuana "easy to obtain." That figure has remained virtually unchanged since 1975, never dropping below 82.7% in three decades of national surveys.

Environmental
With respect to drug crop cultivation, eradication efforts in line with prohibitionist drug policies ultimately force coca, poppy, and marijuana growers into more remote, ecologically sensitive areas. These crops, which are generally grown away from urban centers and state presence, tend to deplete forestland and expand the agricultural frontier.  Out of fear of eradication, cultivators are incentivized to accelerate production cycles in order to obtain the highest yield in the shortest period of time; the pace and methods used by growers neglect measures to promote sustainability, exacerbating the environmental impact.  Drug cultivators typically opt to produce in areas with ecosystems with abundant plant biomass to better conceal their operations.  Ultimately, this practice leads to increased deforestation which contributes to a greater influx of greenhouse gases into the atmosphere.  Moreover, the aerial spraying of herbicides such as glyphosate used in eradication and control efforts have been shown to have negative effects on environmental and human health.

The "balloon effect" also operates further up the drug commodity chain in countries where drugs are trafficked rather than cultivated.  Like eradication programs, interdiction pushes traffickers into remote areas where they exacerbate preexisting pressures on forestland.  Traffickers use slash and burn practices to convert forest into arable land for cash crop production for the purposes of money laundering as well as the construction of clandestine roads and airstrips.  The war on drugs and prohibitionist policies only serve to aggravate the already detrimental impacts of narco-trafficking on Central American forests.  Intensified ecological devastation across cultivation and trafficking zones is yet another negative unintended consequence of emphasis on supply-side narcotic reduction borne by poor countries.

User cost of drugs
When the cost of drugs increases, drug users are more likely to commit crimes in order to obtain money to buy the expensive drugs. Legalizing drugs would make drugs reasonably cheap.

Discriminatory

Arguments for inconsistent drug laws
In response to the issue of consistency with regard to drug prohibition and the dangers of alcohol former director of the ONDCP John P. Walters, has said, "It's ludicrous to say we have a great deal of problems from the use of alcohol so we should multiply that with marijuana".

Arguments against inconsistent drug laws
Since alcohol prohibition ended and the war on drugs began there has been much debate over the issue of consistency among legislators with regard to drug prohibition. Many anti-prohibition activists focus on the well-documented dangers of alcohol (such as alcoholism, cystitis, domestic violence, brain and liver damage). In addition to anecdotal evidence, they cite statistics to show more deaths caused by drunk driving under the influence of alcohol than by drivers under the influence of marijuana, and research which suggests that alcohol is more harmful than all but the most "dangerous" drugs. When the level of harm associated with the other drugs includes harm that arises solely as a result of the drugs illegality rather than merely that danger which is associated with actually using the drugs, only heroin, cocaine, barbiturates and street methadone were shown to be more harmful than the legal drug alcohol.

A 2002 DAWN report, for the USA records two possible drug-induced deaths where marijuana was the only drug found. Legal drugs however, have been the cause of more than half a million deaths a year: 480,000 from tobacco smoking-related illnesses and 80,000 from alcohol use disorder. Together, tobacco and alcohol cause about 20% of all yearly deaths in the USA.

It is argued that inconsistency between the harm caused and the legal status of these common drugs undermines the declared motives of the law enforcement agencies to reduce harm by prohibition, for example of marijuana.

In February 2009, the UK government was accused by its most senior expert drugs adviser Professor David Nutt of making political decisions with regard to drug classification, for example in rejecting the scientific advice to downgrade ecstasy from a class A drug. The Advisory Council on the Misuse of Drugs (ACMD) report on ecstasy, based on a 12-month study of 4,000 academic papers, concluded that it is nowhere near as dangerous as other class A drugs such as heroin and crack cocaine, and should be downgraded to class B. The advice was not followed. Jacqui Smith, then Home Secretary, was also widely criticised by the scientific community for bullying Professor David Nutt into apologising for his comments that, in the course of a normal year, more people died from falling off horses than died from taking ecstasy. Professor Nutt was later sacked by Jacqui Smith's successor as Home Secretary Alan Johnson; Johnson saying "It is important that the government's messages on drugs are clear and as an advisor you do nothing to undermine public understanding of them. I cannot have public confusion between scientific advice and policy and have therefore lost confidence in your ability to advise me as Chair of the ACMD."

Consistency between drugs
In the United States, defendants convicted of selling crack cocaine receive equal sentences to those convicted of selling 100 times the same amount of powder cocaine. This disparity was lessened during the Obama administration when the Fair Sentencing Act 2010 changed the ratio to 18 to 1. The majority of offenders convicted for selling crack are poor and/or black, while the majority of those convicted for selling cocaine are not.

Same policy for distinct drugs
Many drug policies group all illegal drugs into a single category. Since drugs drastically vary in their effects, addictive potential, dosages, methods of production, and consumption the arguments either way could be seen as inconsistent.

Race and enforcement of drug laws
It has been alleged that current drug laws are enforced in such a way as to penalize non-whites more harshly and more often than whites, and to penalize the poor of all races more harshly and more often than the middle and upper classes. For example, up until 2012, crack cocaine carried penalties one hundred times more severe than cocaine despite the fact that these drugs are essentially identical. Especially in urban black communities, convictions were nearly exclusively for crack, while cocaine use is statistically much higher among affluent whites.

Civil rights

Civil rights arguments for prohibitive drug laws
Article 33 of the United Nations Convention on the Rights of the Child reads:

States Parties shall take all appropriate measures, including legislative, administrative, social and educational measures, to protect children from the illicit use of narcotic drugs and psychotropic substances as defined in the relevant international treaties and to prevent the use of children in the illicit production and trafficking of such substances.

Drug Free Australia argues:

The notion that illicit drug use is a victimless crime and that everyone should be free to do what they want with their body disregards the web of social interactions that constitute human existence. Affected by an individual's illicit drug use are children, parents, grandparents, friends, colleagues, work, victims of drugged drivers, crime victims, elder abuse, sexual victims etc. Illicit drug use is no less victimless than alcoholism.

Drug Free Australia gives the example that in 2007 one in every nine children under the age of 18 in the United States lived with at least one drug dependent or drug abusing parent. 2.1 million children in the United States live with at least one parent who was dependent on or used illicit drugs.

The Christian Institute argues that there is no point in having criminal laws unless those caught breaking them will at least face prosecution.  Less serious offenses, such as failing to complete a census form, may also attract a criminal record, so the contention that criminalizing drug use is draconian can be seen as overstatement.

"Parental substance dependence and abuse can have profound effects on children, including child abuse and neglect, injuries and deaths related to motor vehicle accidents, and increased odds that the children will become substance dependent or abusers themselves. Up-to-date estimates of the number of children living with substance-dependent or substance-abusing parents are needed for planning both adult treatment and prevention efforts and programs that support and protect affected children."

Drug Free Australia concludes any democratic society that deems the use of a certain drug to present unacceptable harm to the individual user, to present unacceptable harm to the users' surrounding community or to transfer too great a burden to the community will seek legislation which will curb that particular freedom of the individual.

Sweden's centre-right alliance government Moderate Party advocates "Zero tolerance for crime", arguing:

Many people argue that only drug dealers should be fought and not the drug users themselves.  But this rests on the fundamental error that big-time drugs smugglers and dealers hawk illicit drugs to new consumers.  This is most often not the case.  Rather it is the users themselves that are mostly responsible for recruiting new users through networks of friends or relatives demonstrating that users need to be targeted as the recruiters of new drug use, and that an emphasis on early rehabilitation for young users is the best answer to curbing widespread dealing. Sweden's mandatory rehabilitation program has resulted in the lowest drug use levels in the developed world.

The freedom of choice of those addicted to a drug is also questioned, recognizing that addiction is defined as compulsive by its very nature and that addictions in and of themselves curb individual freedom. Likewise, the proposal that addictive drugs should be legalized, regulated and opened to "free market dynamics" is immediately belied by the recognition that the drug market for an addict is no longer a free market –  it is clear that they will pay any price when needing their drug.

Civil rights arguments for drug law reform

Cognitive liberty

Authors such as Aldous Huxley and Terence McKenna believed that what persons do in private should not be regulated by the government. It is argued that persons should be able to do whatever they want with their bodies, including the recreational use of drugs, as long as they do not harm others. Such arguments often cite the harm principle of philosopher John Stuart Mill who urged that the state had no right to intervene to prevent individuals from doing something that harmed them, if no harm was thereby done to the rest of society: 'Over himself, over his own body and mind, the individual is sovereign' and 'The only purpose for which power can be rightfully exercised over any member of a civilized community, against his will, is to prevent harm to others. His own good, either physical or moral, is not sufficient warrant.' The argument is that drug use is a victimless crime and as such the government has no right to prohibit it or punish drug consumers, much like the government does not forbid overeating, which causes significantly more deaths per year. This can be equated with the quest for freedom of thought.

Spiritual and religious

Some religious groups including the União do Vegetal, the Native American Church, the Bwiti religion and the Rastafari movement (see religious and spiritual use of cannabis) use psychoactive substances as sacrament in religious rituals. In some religious practice, drugs are sometimes used as a conduit to an oceanic feeling or divine union, equated with mysticism or entheogenic ('that which causes God to be within an individual') experiences. In others, the 'entactogenic' qualities of drugs are used to enhance feelings of empathy among congregations.

Personal development and exploration
Some people believe that altered states of consciousness enable many people to push the boundaries of human experience, knowledge, and creativity. There is thus a moral imperative to use drugs in terms of human progress, teleological development, or just increased artistic creativity; such ideas are central to Cognitive Liberty, Stoned Ape Hypothesis and Aldous Huxley's The Doors of Perception.

In PiHKAL, Alexander Shulgin, argues that the psychedelics help us learn about ourselves; indeed that is where the name "psychedelic" (mind expanding) comes from.

Moral and ethical reasons

Moral arguments for prohibitive drug laws

Moral arguments for drug law reform
Many people, including some religious groups, argue that the war on drugs is itself immoral.

In 2007, Richard Brunstrom, the Chief Constable of North Wales, one of Britain's most senior police officers, said "If policy on drugs is in future to be pragmatic not moralistic, driven by ethics not dogma, then the current prohibitionist stance will have to be swept away as both unworkable and immoral, to be replaced with an evidence-based unified system (specifically including tobacco and alcohol) aimed at minimisation of harms to society."

The author and physician Andrew Weil has commented on the peculiar attitude and emotional bias of some people who think "drug taking is bad", but who nevertheless consume alcohol, and formulate the unhelpful conception "We drink. Therefore alcohol is not a drug."

The UK drug policy reform group Release believe that the stigma attached to drug use needs to be removed. Release's actions have included challenging such stigmatisation with its "Nice People Take Drugs" advertising campaign.

Political

Sending out signals

Arguments for sending out signals
Some argue that sending out signals should be a consideration of drug policy. Previous UK Home Office Minister Vernon Coaker argued "is not part of any system with respect to drugs ... not only trying to send messages out to people who misuse drugs but also about trying to send messages out to people out there in the community?"

In response to the UK government's official drugs advisory body's opposition to cannabis reclassification (upwards, from a class C to a class B drug) in 2008, prime minister Gordon Brown said: "I believe that if we're sending out a signal, particularly to teenagers – and particular those at the most vulnerable age, young teenagers – that in any way we find cannabis acceptable, given all we know about the way that cannabis is being sold in this country, that is not the right thing to do. There's a stronger case now for sending out a signal that cannabis is not only illegal, it's unacceptable."

Arguments against sending out signals
The Science and Technology Select Committee appointed by the House of Commons to inquire into the Government's handling of scientific advice, risk and evidence in policy making agreed with Transform Drug Policy Foundation's view that "Criminal law is supposed to prevent crime, not 'send out' public health messages". Transform warned that sending out signals could backfire by "fostering distrust of police and public health messages amongst young people". The Select Committee's report said "The Government's desire to use the Class of a particular drug to send out a signal to potential users or dealers does not sit comfortably with the claim that the primary objective of the classification system is to categorise drugs according to the comparative harm associated with their misuse. It is also incompatible with the Government's stated commitment to evidence based policy making since it has never undertaken research to establish the relationship between the Class of a drug and the signal sent out and there is, therefore, no evidence base on which to draw in making these policy decisions."

Political calculation

Arguments for political calculation
John Donnelly, writing for the Boston Globe on the presidential race of 2000, suggested that the candidates' silence on drug policy may stem from a widely shared belief that any position even hinting at reducing penalties for drug use would be political suicide. Charles R. Schuster, director of the National Institute on Drug Abuse under Presidents Reagan and Bush (Snr.), was reported as saying in 1997, "Talking sense about drug policy in today's climate of opinion can be political suicide."

Drug policy academic Mark A.R. Kleiman has argued: 

Scott Morgan reports how he once attended a discussion of Peter Reuter and David Boyum's book An Analytic Assessment of U.S. Drug Policy, in which the authors admitted ignoring the legalization option in their analysis. Boyum claimed that there was no legitimate political support for ending the drug war and that he and Reuter had therefore confined themselves to recommendations that they thought were politically viable.

Arguments against political calculation
The deaths of two teenage boys in the United Kingdom in March 2010 sparked a nationwide controversy over the amphetamine drug mephedrone, which had gained popularity as a legal high. The Advisory Council on the Misuse of Drugs (ACMD) recommended a ban on the drug, which was quickly passed into law, but the decision was criticised for being politically rather than scientifically driven and led to the resignation of the ACMD's Eric Carlin, the eighth member of the council to leave in five months in protest at what was seen as political interference. Toxicology reports released in May revealed that the boys had never taken the drug. In a later commentary, David Nutt noted that the pharmacology of mephedrone was not known at the time it was banned, and that the decision was so knee-jerk that the ACMD accidentally banned the wrong enantiomer for about a year.

Professor Colin Blakemore, professor of neuroscience at the University of Oxford, said: "This shocking news should be a salutary lesson to tabloid journalists and prejudiced politicians who held a gun to the heads of the ACMD and demanded that this drug should be banned before a single autopsy had been completed ... The politicians talk about using drug classification as a way of sending 'messages' to young people. I fear that the only message that will be sent by the hasty decision on mephedrone is that the drug laws deserve no respect."

Professor David Nutt, the former chairman of the ACMD, said: "the previous government's rush to ban mephedrone never had any serious scientific credibility – it looks much more like a decision based on a short-term electoral calculation. This news demonstrates why it's so important to base drug classification on the evidence, not fear, and why the police, media and politicians should only make public pronouncements once the facts are clear."

Public opinion

Public opinion on prohibitive drug laws
A direct example of societal attitudes driving the International Drug Conventions is the 1925 speech by the Egyptian delegate M. El Guindy to the 1925 Geneva Convention forum which prohibited cannabis – largely reproduced in Willoughby, W. W.;  In the late 19th and early 20th century drug use was regarded by the public "as alone a habit, vice, sign of weakness or dissipation", similar to the view of those who could not control their use of the licit drug alcohol. The use of illicit drugs has been prohibited internationally since 1912, an entire century, because of international agreement that the general community has a greater right to protect itself from the harms of illicit drug use than does an individual user to use a harmful substance recreationally.

Currently there is still greater public support for the continued prohibiting of illicit drug use than there is for legalizing and regulating the use of these substances. In the United States 82% of those polled by the Family Research Association in 1998 were opposed to the legalization of heroin and cocaine in the same manner as alcohol is legal.  In October 2009 a Gallup poll found that 54% of those polled were against the legalization of cannabis. In Australia, which has had the highest levels of illicit drug use in Organisation for Economic Co-operation and Development (or OECD) countries for more than a decade, according to a 2007 survey, 95% of Australians do not support the legalization of heroin, cocaine and amphetamines, and 79% do not support the legalization of cannabis.

It can be argued that the negative attitudes to illicit drug use which issued in the international drug Conventions, with prohibitions against their use 100 years ago, still exist today. Taking again statistics from Australia, 97% disapprove of the regular use of heroin, 96% disapprove the regular use of amphetamines or cocaine, and 76.5% disapprove of the regular use of cannabis. In any democracy where "the will of the people" is respected by its political representatives, the prohibition of these substance might well be expected to remain intact.

Public opinion on drug law reform
According to Transform Drug Policy Foundation, over the past decade there has been strong shift in public opinion in favour of drug policy reform. This shift has taken place despite successive government's reluctance to consider or debate the subject, or even call to for an independent inquiry.

A national telephone survey conducted in 1993 found that between 52% and 55% of Australians believed that growing and possessing cannabis for personal use should be legalised.

An ICM poll of 1201 people for The Guardian in 1998 found that 47% believed that the illegality of drugs actually encourages young people to try them.

46% of UK adults in a 2002 Guardian poll (of 1075) felt that drug addicts who register themselves as such should have access to certain illegal drugs via prescription.

An ICM poll of 1008 UK adults (aged 16+) for The Guardian in 2008 found that 38% would support a scheme, similar to that established in Portugal and Spain, whereby it is not a criminal offence to possess and use drugs privately.

Following President Barack Obama's win of the 2008 presidential election, Change.gov hosted a service on their website named the Citizen's Briefing Book allowing United States citizens to give their opinion on the most important issues in America, and allow others to vote up or down on those ideas. The top ten ideas are to be given to Obama on the day of his inauguration, January 20, 2009. The most popular idea according to respondents was "Ending Marijuana Prohibition", earning 92,970 points and obtaining a total of 3,550 comments.
The second most popular hope, by contrast, was "Commit to becoming the "Greenest" country in the world." with 70,470 points.

Marijuana has seen a renaissance in its utopian representation in films such as the suburban satire American Beauty (1999, dir. Sam Mendes) and the stoner comedy Pineapple Express (2008, dir. David Gordon Green). Another venue for contemporary criticism of marijuana prohibition is television, such as the Showtime series Weeds (2005–2012, dev. Jenji Kohan); the HBO series True Blood (2008–2014, dev. Alan Ball); and adult animation shows such as South Park, Family Guy, and American Dad!.

David Simon, creator of the television series The Wire, in 2011 told U.S. Attorney General Eric Holder that he'd "give him another season of the HBO show for an end to the war on drugs." Holder had invited show stars Wendell Pierce, Sonja Sohn, and Jim True-Frost to Washington on behalf of an anti-drug public relations campaign and at the time called on Simon and Ed Burns for another season or a movie of the show. Simon replied via a letter to a newspaper offering the trade.

In November 2020, 76 percent of voters in Washington D.C. voted in favor of the initiative to decriminalize psychedelic plants and fungi.

See also

 Altered state of consciousness
 Cognitive liberty
 Darknet market
 Demand reduction
 Drug addiction
 Drug Policy Alliance
 Drug policy of Sweden
 Drug policy of the Netherlands
 Drug policy of Portugal
 Drug possession
 Freedom of thought
 Harm reduction
 Illegal drug trade
 Law Enforcement Against Prohibition
 NORML, National Organization to Reform Marijuana Laws.
 Neurotheology
 Perverse incentive
 Prohibition (drugs)
 Recreational drug use
 The Rhetoric of Drugs
 Transform Drug Policy Foundation
 War on drugs
 Zero tolerance

Notes

References

Further reading
 "The Mission to End Prohibition." Making Contact. National Radio Project, Oakland CA: 4 November 2009 
 The Cult of Pharmacology: How America Became the World's Most Troubled Drug Culture. Richard DeGrandpre, Duke University Press, 2006. 
 Toward a Policy on Drugs: Decriminalization? Legalization? Currie, Elliot. Dissent. 1993. Rpt. in Drug Use Should Be Decriminalized. At Issue: Legalizing Drugs. Karin L. Swisher, ed., San Diego, CA.: Greenhaven Press, Inc., 1996: 55–64.
 Rolles S. Kushlick D. Jay M. 2004 After the War on Drugs, Options for Control Transform Drug Policy Foundation
 Legalization Madness. Inciardi, James A. and Christine A. Saum. Public Interest 123 (1996): 72–82. Rpt. in Legalizing Drugs Would Increase Violent Crime. Current Controversies: Illegal Drugs. Charles P. Cozic, ed., San Diego, CA.: Greenhaven Press, Inc., 1998: 142–150.
 Poll Shows Most Russians Against Legalization of Soft Drugs. ITAR-TASS. BBC Monitoring 26 June 2003. Newsbank. 1 Feb 2004.
 Jaffer, Mehru, U.N. Firm Against Legalization of Drugs. Inter Press Service 17 Apr. 2003. Newsbank. 1 Feb. 2004 .
 Lavoie, Dusty, Marijuanatopia?---Placing Pot Media in the U.S. Social Imaginary: Surveillance, Consumption & Pleasure. ProQuest Dissertations, University of Maine, 2011.
 Luna, Claire. Orange County Judge Gray, a Drug-War Foe, Will Run for Senate Now a Libertarian, the Longtime Advocate of Legalization Will Challenge Boxer in 2004. Los Angeles Times 20 Nov. 2003: B3. Newsbank. 1 Feb. 2004 .
 Lynch, Gerald W. Legalizing Drugs Is Not the Solution. America 13 Feb. 1993. Rpt. in Legalizing Drugs Would Not Reduce Crime. At Issue: Legalizing Drugs. Karin L. Swisher, ed., San Diego, CA.: Greenhaven Press, Inc., 1996: 110–113.
 McNeely, Jennifer. Methadone Maintenance Treatment. Lindesmith Center 1997. Rpt. in Methadone Is an Effective Treatment for Heroin Addiction. Current Controversies: Illegal Drugs. Charles P. Cozic, ed., San Diego, CA.: Greenhaven Press, Inc., 1998: 91–95.
 McWilliams, Peter. Ain't Nobody's Business If You Do. Los Angeles, CA. : Prelude Press, 1996 (full text)
 Mendez, Julia de Cruz and Ralf Winkler. Marihuana Tax Act of 1937. Jan. 1996. 24 Mar. 2004 .
 Paulin, Alastair. Taxation Without Legalization. Mother Jones June 2003: 26. Newsbank. 1 Feb. 2004 .
 Rodriguez, L. Jacabo. Time to End the Drug War. CATO Institute 13 Dec. 1997. 23 Feb. 2004 .
 Should We Re-Legalize Drugs? United States Libertarian Party. 22 Feb. 2004 .
 Thornton, Mark. Alcohol Prohibition Was a Failure. CATO Institute 17 July 1991. 24 Mar. 2004 .
 Zuckerman, Mortimer B. Great Idea for Ruining Kids. U.S. News & World Report 24 Feb. 1997. Rpt. in Legalizing Drugs Would Increase Drug Use. Current Controversies: Illegal Drugs. Charles P. Cozic, ed., San Diego, CA.: Greenhaven Press, Inc., 1998: 151–152.
 Leavitt, Fred. (2003) The REAL Drug Abusers. Rowman & Littlefield.
 Armentano, Paul. Drug War Mythology in You Are Being Lied To. China: The Disinformation Company Ltd., 2001. Pages 234–240
 Goldstein, P.J., Brownstein, H.H., Ryan, P.J. & Bellucci, P.A., Crack and Homicide in New York City: A Case Study in the Epidemiology of Violence, in Reinarman, C. and Levine, H. (eds.), Crack in America: Demon Drugs and Social Justice (Berkeley, CA: University of California Press, 1997), pp. 113–130.
 Skorneck, Carolyn (Feb 1990). "Survey: 61 percent say all drugs immoral". Moscow-Pullman Daily News.

External links
 Why It's Time to Legalize Drugs. Published by HuffPost on 23 February 2016. Last updated on 23 February 2017. Author - Kofi Annan (Secretary-General of the United Nations from January 1997 to December 2006).
 "After the War on Drugs: Blueprint for Regulation", 1 July 2009
 The Mission to End Prohibition, Making Contact. 4 Nov 2009.
 EMCDDA—Decriminalisation in Europe? Recent developments in legal approaches to drug use.
 The case for legalisation, The Economist, Jul. 26 2001.
 The Senlis Council, international think tank on drug policy reform.
 European coalition for Just and effective drugs policies
 Cannabis. American Heritage Dictionary of the English Language. Fourth Edition. 2000. Rpt. in Dictionary.com 25 Mar 2004
 War on Drugs. Mary H. Cooper. Congressional Quarterly 13 Mar. 1993: 243–258. SIRS. 1 Feb. 2004.
 An interview with pro-legalization Nobel laureate economist Milton Friedman
 The Drug War as a Socialist Enterprise by Milton Friedman
 Simpson, John, 'Rethinking the war on drugs', BBC News, 7 October 2005.
 Marijuana 'top cash crop in US', BBC News, 19 December 2006.

Civil rights and liberties

Political controversies
Drug culture